is a retired Japanese artistic gymnast. He is a seven-time Olympic medalist (all-around, team and floor exercise), winning three golds and four silvers, and a twenty-one-time World medalist (all-around, team, floor exercise, horizontal bar and parallel bars).

Uchimura was already considered by many in the sport to be the greatest gymnast of all time after winning Olympic gold at the 2012 Summer Olympics in London, but he then extended his accomplishments even further when he followed up that performance there with additional and uninterrupted victories of every major competition throughout the next Olympic cycle, leading up to wins of two more gold medals on team and individual all-around at the 2016 Summer Olympics in Rio de Janeiro. Uchimura is known for being the first gymnast (male or female) to capture every major all-around title in an entire single Olympic cycle, accomplishing this feat twice by securing six world (2009–2011 and 2013–2015) and two Olympic (2012 London Olympics, and 2016 Rio Olympics) individual all-around titles. Uchimura also took the individual all-around silver medal at the 2008 Summer Olympics in Beijing. He is known for delivering difficult and accurately executed routines. The International Gymnast Magazine had praised his skills as a "combination of tremendous difficulty, supreme consistency and extraordinary elegance of performance."

Early life and career
Uchimura was born in Kitakyushu, Fukuoka Prefecture, and began gymnastics at age 3 at his parents' sports club in Nagasaki Prefecture. His parents, Kazuhisa and Shuko Uchimura, were both competitive gymnasts. At age 15, he moved to Tokyo to train with Athens gold medalist Naoya Tsukahara. His younger sister Haruhi Uchimura is also a gymnast. Kōhei Uchimura stated of his beliefs, "I don’t believe in God. I never had lucky charms. All I believe in is practice." In his first international competition, the 2005 International Junior Competition in Japan, he competed outside the official competition.

Senior career

2007
Uchimura joined Japan's national team in 2007. He made his senior debut at the 2007 Paris World Cup in March, a major international event. Here, he won bronze on vault and placed 9th on floor. In August, he won team gold, gold on floor, and bronze on vault at the 2007 Summer Universiade in Bangkok. At Japan's national championships in October, he placed 7th in the all-around. A month later at the international "Good Luck Beijing" event, he won silver with the Japanese team and placed 7th on floor exercise.

2008
Uchimura started the 2008 season by winning gold on floor at the World Cup in Tianjin in May.

Later that summer, he was selected to represent Japan at the 2008 Olympic Games in Beijing as a member of the national team. At the Olympics, he contributed to the team silver by competing on floor, vault, parallel bars, and high bar. He qualified for the all-around final, where he won the silver medal. His 2nd place win behind China's Yang Wei gave Japan its first Olympic medal in the event in 24 years. He obtained the highest mark of that meet on the floor 15.825 (double Arabian piked half out, triple twist dismount) and had a spectacular high bar routine (Kolman, piked Kovacs). He also qualified through to the floor final, where he placed fifth.

At the Japanese national championships that year, the 19-year-old Uchimura racked up the highest scores on floor exercise and pommel horse en route to winning his first national all around title. He was the first teenager in 12 years to win the Japanese men's national title.

2009
In October 2009, Uchimura competed at the 2009 World Championships. Here, he dominated both the qualifications and the all around final. He won the all around title by a margin of 2.575 points ahead of Daniel Keatings, marking top scores for floor, rings, vault, and horizontal bar. Uchimura placed fourth on floor and sixth on high bar as well.

He appeared on the cover of the December 2009 number of the International Gymnastics Magazine which was entitled "Uchimura rules".

2010

In October 2010, Uchimura headed to the 2010 World Championships again as a member of the Japanese national team. As in the previous year, he dominated the all-around qualifications and finals, taking his second consecutive all-around title by a margin of 2.251 points ahead of Philipp Boy. In the all-around final, he had the top score of the day on floor, and highest execution mark (9.666) for a Yurchenko 2½ twists on vault. He contributed to Japan's team silver medal by competing in the team final on all events except still rings too. He qualified for two event finals, winning silver on floor and bronze on parallel bars.

2011

On October 14, 2011, Uchimura won the all-around final for the 3rd time at the 2011 World Championships in Tokyo, Japan. With a score of 93.631 points, Uchimura won by a margin of 3.101 points, roughly the same margin that separated 2nd and 14th place. Not only is he the first male gymnast to win three all-around titles, but he is also the first gymnast, male or female, to win three consecutive all-around titles.

During the all-around final, Uchimura recorded the highest score on four of the six events: floor exercise, still rings, parallel bars, and pommel horse (he tied for the highest score on pommel horse). Uchimura also qualified for five of the six individual apparatus finals, all except vault. He won his first World Championship gold medal on floor exercise, as well as a bronze medal on high bar and the silver medal with the Japanese team.

At the 2011 Worlds, Uchimura also won the Longines Prize for Elegance along with Romania's Ana Porgras. The prize is given at each World Championships to the male and female gymnasts who demonstrate "the most remarkable elegance". The winners were unanimously declared by a panel of judges, where both Uchimura and Porgras were each awarded a trophy, a Longines watch, and US$5,000. Uchimura was especially pleased to win this award, since he collects watches.

In November 2011, Uchimura won 4 gold medals at the 65th Japanese Championships. Besides the all-around title, he also picked up titles on half of the apparatuses: floor exercise, pommel horse, and high bar.

2012
Uchimura competed in the London 2012 Olympics in London and fell several times in qualifications, which put him in ninth place among the group of qualifiers for the individual all-around final. In the men's team gymnastics final, Uchimura fell from the pommel horse during his dismount. The Japanese coaches appealed the scoring on this performance as he still landed on his feet and felt it should have counted as a full dismount, albeit with a large penalty. Before the appeal, Great Britain were to get the silver and Ukraine the bronze, but the appeal pushed Japan's points total up to secure the silver behind China, which pushed Great Britain down to the bronze.

In the men's individual all-around final, Uchimura dominated the competition and won the gold medal with a score of 92.690. He also won the silver medal in the men's floor exercise event final with a score of 15.800, thanks to the tie-breaking procedure. It was automatically triggered due to his second highest combined score in the final tying the one by Denis Ablyazin of Russia, who did have the highest difficulty score of 7.1 among all finalists due to more passes. Unfortunately when there is a tie, the gymnast instead with the higher execution score will place ahead, which was Uchimura who posted the highest execution of 9.100 in the final.

2013
During qualifications Uchimura dominated, garnering an all-around total of 91.924, which was 2.392 points ahead of the closest competitor. He qualified for the floor exercise finals in third place with a 15.333, first for the parallel bars final with 15.400 and third in the horizontal bar final with a 15.658. He qualified as a reserve for the pommel horse final with a 15.133.

Uchimura won a record fourth consecutive all-around gold medal at the 2013 World Artistic Gymnastics Championships in Antwerp. Uchimura finished with 91.990 points, almost two points ahead of the next nearest competitor. Uchimura also won bronze medals on floor exercise (15.500) behind Japan's 17-year-old newcomer Kenzō Shirai (16.000) and Jacob Dalton of the United States (15.600), and the horizontal bar (15.633) behind Epke Zonderland of the Netherlands (16.000) and Fabian Hambüchen of Germany (15.933), as well as a gold medal for parallel bars (15.666). His total of four individual medals is the highest number of medals Uchimura has earned at a single World Championships.

2014
On October 9, 2014, Uchimura once again made history, winning a record fifth consecutive world championship all-around gold at Nanning. He totaled 91.965 points, 1.492 points above Great Britain's Max Whitlock to capture the title.

Uchimura also secured the silver on the horizontal bar apparatus after he posted scores that sandwiched them between those by Epke Zonderland (Netherlands), who won the gold, and Marijo Možnik (Croatia), who took the bronze.

2015
On October 30, 2015, Uchimura won a record sixth all-around world gymnastics championship title, achieving a total score of 92.332, more than 1.6 points ahead of Cuban teenager Manrique Larduet and Deng Shudi of China.

Uchimura started off on the floor with a 15.733, and led Deng by 0.600 after the first rotation. Then on pommel horse, he scored a 15.100. He would continued with a 14.933 on rings, 15.633 on vault, and 15.833 on parallel bars before wrapping things up with a 15.100 on the horizontal bar, one of his best apparatuses, on which he had also taken a fall, just a few days before in the team competition.

Uchimura would then go on to win the horizontal bar apparatus final as well with a score of 15.833 ahead of Danell Leyva (United States) and Larduet.

However, what was even more significant was that Uchimura led Japan to victory in the team event final where they defeated Great Britain and China. This was their first team gold since the 1978 World Championships in Strasbourg.

2016

Uchimura competed in the 2016 Summer Olympics in Rio de Janeiro. In the men's team all-around final, team captain Uchimura anchored the Japanese men to win the team gold medal with a total score of 274.094, reclaiming the title for Japan and the first time since the 2004 Summer Olympics in Athens.

Two days after the final of team event, Uchimura defended his individual all-around (AA) gold medal with a total score of 92.365, becoming the first gymnast in 44 years to win back-to-back individual all-around (IAA) golds at the Olympics. With his individual all-around silver medal from the 2008 Summer Olympics in Beijing, he also became only the second man in history after countryman Sawao Kato, who also won two golds and one silver in the individual all-around competition across the 1968 Mexico City, 1972 Munich and 1976 Montreal Olympics, to medal on the men's individual all-around event at three Olympic Games. His winning margin over silver medallist Oleg Vernyayev of Ukraine was extremely slim at only 0.099, less than a small step deduction on landing in terms of gymnastics scoring.

2017
At the 2017 World Artistic Gymnastics Championships in Montreal, his world all-around champion streak that began in 2009 came to an end when he injured his ankle on the vault landing in qualification, forcing him to withdraw.

This led to his long win-streak at worlds and Olympics being unexpectedly broken for the only time since he started winning the first of his six World Championships all-around title to begin the 2009 quad, and continue over the next two complete Olympic cycles (approximately 8 years), ending them by winning his second Olympic all-around title in 2016. This was also the first time in 9 years since before 2008 that he did not medal, namely silver and/or gold medals, at one of the FIG's major competitions—the Olympics or World Championships.

2018–2019
Between October 25 and November 3, 2018, Uchimura competed at the 2018 World Artistic Gymnastics Championships in Doha but on a reduced schedule. During the team event final, he had helped Team Japan secure the bronze medal behind team event champion China and runner-up Russia by contributing scores to four apparatuses—pommel horse (14.133), rings (14.200), parallel bars (14.500) and high bar (14.400). Uchimura also qualified for the individual event final on the horizontal bar, winning the silver medal with a score of 14.800 behind the 2012 Olympic high bar champion, Epke Zonderland of the Netherlands, who scored a 15.100.

Uchimura did not compete in any significant competitions during the 2019 season due to injuries.

2020–2021
At the age of 32, Uchimura qualified for the 2020 Summer Olympics in Tokyo, Japan, his fourth and home Olympic Games, as an apparatus specialist on the horizontal bar after a tiebreak in the selection process worked in his favour. He has expressed earlier that he could still contribute positively to the Japanese team but perhaps not with the kind of gruelling physical requirements that are necessary for an all-arounder anymore.

At the Olympics, Uchimura did not qualify for the high bar finals after placing 20th due to mistake in the qualifying round, and decided to skip the parallel bars event. The eventual gold medalist in the individual all-around and horizontal bar finals was countryman Daiki Hashimoto (most successful gymnast at these Games and also considered to be Uchimura's heir apparent), who at 19 years, 11 months and 21 days old became Japan's second youngest teen gold medal gymnast (lost by only six days to Kenzō Shirai at the 2016 Summer Games), as well as their youngest ever individual gold medal gymnast in Olympic history on the individual all-around (AA) and high bar events.

On October 18–24, 2021, competing at home in Kitakyushu, Japan, Uchimura, oldest at 32 years, 9 months and 21 days old, was selected as part of the Japanese world championship team in artistic gymnastics (AG) as an apparatus specialist to compete only on the individual horizontal bar event. He qualified in fifth place with a score of 14.300 for the event final where he finished in sixth place with a score of 14.600. This was long intended to be his final competition, concluding an illustrious career, which many would consider him the best of all time. His apparent successor, the men's 2020 Olympics individual all-around and horizontal bar champion, Hashimoto, was the top individual horizontal bar qualifier with a score of 14.633. For the same two individual events, he earned himself two silver medals in the individual all-around and horizontal bar finals instead with scores of 87.964 and 14.600. Hu Xuwei and Zhang Boheng, both of China, respectively won the men's individual all-around and horizontal bar events with scores of 87.981 and 15.166. Lastly, Hashimoto placed fourth in the men's individual parallel bars finals with a score of 15.000, but also withdrew from the men's individual pommel horse and floor exercise finals, for which he qualified too.

Retirement
On January 10, 2022, Uchimura officially announced his retirement from the sport of gymnastics. He had been plagued with various persistent injuries ever since his withdrawal from the 2017 World Championships due to an ankle injury sustained after an awkward vault landing during qualification rounds of the men's individual all-around competition. Although Uchimura retired without any eponymous skill to his name, he often said that owning one was never a primary focus in his career for him to be remembered. Additionally, Uchimura had also successfully executed some of the most difficult skills soon after they had been originated, such as the H (0.8)-rated Bretschneider or double-twisting Kovac on the horizontal bar in 2015, which Uchimura had remained one of the very few who had ever been able to successfully complete it but also regularly and consistently perform it at a level comparable to or more often above its originator, German Andreas Bretschneider, up through his last competition at home towards the end of 2021. Finally, there is now little doubt by many people connected to the sport that Uchimura has retired as the greatest gymnast of all time, male or female.

Competitive history

Personal life
Uchimura married in autumn of 2012 and has two daughters, born in 2013 and 2015. Asked if he would teach them gymnastics, he replied, "If they were boys I think I probably would... but I don't understand women's gymnastics, and I think it's much more severe." He eats just one meal a day and rather dislikes vegetables.

See also
 List of multiple Olympic gold medalists at a single Games
 List of multiple Olympic medalists
 List of Olympic medal leaders in men's gymnastics

References

External links

 
 
 
 

1989 births
Living people
Japanese atheists
Medalists at the World Artistic Gymnastics Championships
Japanese male artistic gymnasts
Olympic gymnasts of Japan
Gymnasts at the 2008 Summer Olympics
Gymnasts at the 2012 Summer Olympics
Gymnasts at the 2016 Summer Olympics
Olympic gold medalists for Japan
Olympic silver medalists for Japan
Olympic medalists in gymnastics
Medalists at the 2008 Summer Olympics
Medalists at the 2012 Summer Olympics
Medalists at the 2016 Summer Olympics
Recipients of the Medal with Purple Ribbon
Sportspeople from Kitakyushu
Universiade medalists in gymnastics
Universiade gold medalists for Japan
Universiade bronze medalists for Japan
Gymnasts at the 2020 Summer Olympics